Corymborkis, commonly known as cinnamon orchids, or 管花兰属 (guan hua lan shu) is a genus of eight species of orchids in the family Orchidaceae. They are evergreen, terrestrial plants which grow in clumps and have thin roots, leafy stems, pleated leaves and widely-opening flowers with thin, spreading sepals and petals. They are widely distributed in the tropics.

Description
Orchids in the genus Corymborkis are terrestrial, evergreen herbs which often grow in clumps and have short rhizomes and thin, wiry stems. One or more thin, unbranched stems arise from the same rhizome and have many papery, pleated, egg-shaped to elliptic leaves near their top half. A branching flowering stem develops from the upper leaf axils and carry crowded, widely-opening flowers. The flowers are greenish white and usually have thin, spreading sepals and petals which are similar to each other, with the petals slightly wider than the sepals. The labellum is about as long as the sepals, closely surrounds the column and has a tube-like base and two longitudinal ridges.

Taxonomy and naming
The genus Corymborkis was first formally described in 1809 by Louis-Marie Aubert du Petit-Thouars and the description was published in Bulletin de la Société philomathique de Paris. The name Corymborkis is derived from the Ancient Greek words korymbos meaning "bunch of flowers or fruit" and orchis meaning "testicle" or "orchid", referring to the bunched flowers of these orchids.

Distribution and habitat
Orchids in this genus are found in tropical Africa, India, Sri Lanka, Thailand, Malaysia, the Philippines, Indonesia, New Guinea and Australia, including on Christmas Island. They usually grow in moist, shady places in rainforest.

List of species
The following is a list of species of Corymborkis recognised by the World Checklist of Selected Plant Families as at August 2018:

 Corymborkis corymbis Thouars - Africa from Guinea to Ethiopia to South Africa; Madagascar, Mauritius, Réunion
 Corymborkis flava (Sw.) Kuntze - South America, Central America, Cuba, Jamaica
 Corymborkis forcipigera (Rchb.f. & Warsz.) L.O.Williams - Mexico, Central America, West Indies, Colombia
 Corymborkis galipanensis (Rchb.f.) Foldats - Venezuela
 Corymborkis guyanensis Szlach. S.Nowak & Baranow - Guyana
 Corymborkis harlingii Szlach. & Kolan - Colombia to Ecuador
 Corymborkis minima P.J.Cribb - Cameroon, Equatorial Guinea
 Corymborkis veratrifolia (Reinw.) Blume - China, Indian Subcontinent, Southeast Asia, New Guinea, Queensland, Pacific Islands

References

 
Tropidieae genera
Terrestrial orchids
Orchids of Africa
Orchids of Asia
Orchids of Oceania